Scoparia dicteella is a species of moth in the family Crambidae. It is found in mainland Greece and on Crete.

The wingspan is about 23 mm.

References

Moths described in 1916
Scorparia
Moths of Europe